Life MC (or simply Life) is a British rapper who gained prominence as a member of the Luton-based British hip hop group Phi Life Cypher with fellow rapper Si Phili and DJ Nappa. Life has released five solo albums to date as well as various mixtapes with DJ Nappa. He is renowned for his freestyling capabilities, alongside several music videos filmed in and around Luton.

Discography

Albums
 Everyday Life (2003)
 Realities Of Life (2006)
 Outside Looking In (2008)
 Life Beyond Rap (2010)
 Gift of Life (2013)
 Sounds of the Underground (2014)

Mixtapes
The Ultimate Flow Championship (2005)
The Ultimate Flow Championship (2012)
Da Throwback (2012)

With Phi Life Cypher
 Millennium Metaphors (2000, Jazz Fudge)
 The Instrumentals (2000, Jazz Fudge)
 Higher Forces (2003)
 Playback (2006)

With Task Force
 The Chosen Few EP (2002)

References

Year of birth missing (living people)
Living people
English male rappers
People from Luton